

A
Bharat Agnihotri - Alberta Liberal MLA
Kiran Ahluwalia - singer
Nira Arora - morning show radio host for CFBT-FM 94.5 in Vancouver, BC
Akshay Kumar - actor

B
Anita Rau Badami - novelist
Ashish Bagai - former captain of the Canadian cricket team
Manjul Bhargava - mathematician, Fields Medalist
Ruby Bhatia - VJ, television show host, and actress
Hardial Bains - founder and leader of the Marxist–Leninist Party of Canada, 1970–1997
Harry Bains - British Columbia New Democratic MLA
Navdeep Bains - Liberal Member of Parliament
Neeru Bajwa - Canadian actress, director and producer
Shauna Singh Baldwin - novelist
Rupan Bal - actor and youtuber
Bas Balkissoon - MPP
Nirmala Basnayake - rock singer (controller.controller)
Sheela Basrur - former Ontario Chief Medical Officer of Health and Assistant Deputy Minister of Public Health
Nuvraj Singh Bassi - professional football player
Robin Bawa - played for several NHL teams and in minor leagues
Ishq Bector - HipHop/R&B musician and composer
Nadira Begg - television journalist
Stan Bharti - businessman and philanthropist
Shashi Bhat - writer
Arjan Bhullar - wrestler
Sim Bhullar - NBA basketball player
Neil Bissoondath - author
Glenda Braganza - actress
Jagrup Brar - British Columbia NDP MLA

C
Baljit Singh Chadha - 
Ashok Chandwani - 
Gulzar Singh Cheema -
Jasbir Singh Cheema -
Paul Chohan - 
Raj Chouhan -
Saroja Coelho -
Nazneen Contractor -

D
Deepa Mehta - Filmmaker
Cindy Daniel - singer
Dipika Damerla - MPP Ontario
Joe Daniel - Conservative MP and first Malayali elected to Parliament
Agam Darshi - actress and filmmaker
Karen David - pop singer
Monika Deol - former MuchMusic host and CIVT news anchor
Ranjeev Deol - field hockey player
Sudi Devanesen - physician and member of the Order of Canada
Herb Dhaliwal - Liberal MP and the first Indo-Canadian cabinet minister
Ranj Dhaliwal - Canadian author
Sukh Dhaliwal - Liberal MP
Naranjan Dhalla - cardiovascular research scientist and member of the Order of Canada
Ruby Dhalla - Liberal MP
Sunil Dhaniram - cricket player
Bob Singh Dhillon - Punjabi Indo-Canadian Sikh property businessman
Haninder Dhillon - cricket player
R Paul Dhillon - director, producer, writer and journalist
Vekeana Dhillon - Vancouver screenwriter, television presenter, actress
Vic Dhillon - Ontario Liberal MPP
Vikram Dhillon - Vancouver producer, director, actor and television presenter
Ujjal Dosanjh - former Premier of British Columbia, first Indian-Canadian premier, former federal Minister of Health, and current National Defence Critic
John Dossetor - physician and bioethicist, member of the Order of Canada
Ian D'Sa - guitarist of rock band Billy Talent

E

F

G
Nisha Ganatra - film director, film producer, writer and actor
Shuman Ghosemajumder - businessman and computer scientist
Sara Ghulam - Miss World Canada 2007
Raminder Gill - former Ontario Progressive Conservative MPP and federal Conservative candidate
Jyoti Gondek - politician, incumbent Mayor of Calgary
Dylan Mohan Gray - film director, producer, writer
Gurmant Grewal - Former Conservative MP (3-terms)and Deputy Opposition House Leader, half (with Nina, listed below) of the first married couple to serve as MPs in the same session of Parliament
Nina Grewal - Conservative MP (4-terms), half (with Gurmant) of the first married couple to serve as MPs in the same session of Parliament

Pooja Handa - journalist
Syeda Saiyidain Hameed - Indian Canadian social and women's rights activist, educationist, writer, former member of the Planning Commission of India; executive assistant to the Minister of Advanced Education and Manpower, Government of Alberta, 1975; Director of Colleges and Universities at the ministry, 1978
Ian Hanomansing - CBC journalist
Tara Singh Hayer - newspaper publisher
Kash Heed - former chief constable of West Vancouver Police Department; former superintendent with the Vancouver Police Department
Kamal Heer - singer
Rena Heer - worked with Channel M, then with Global BC and now on CTV
Darryl Hinds - actor and comedian

H

I
Indrani - full name Indrani Pal-Chaudhuri, photographer, director, TV personality and model
Chin Injeti - R&B musician
Anosh Irani - novelist and playwright
Inderjit Vasudevan Moorthy - Indo Canadian entrepreneur

J
Aditya Jha - Global Entrepreneur & Philanthropist 
Ellis Jacob - businessman person
Mobina Jaffer - senator
Rahim Jaffer - former Alberta Conservative MP (Edmonton-Strathcona)
Kim Jagtiani - television personality
Neilank Jha - Canadian neurosurgeon 
Jazzy B - singer
Bidhu Jha - Manitoba NDP MLA
Avan Jogia - actor
Bindy Johal - Vancouver gangster and underworld Don
Prakash John - R&B musician
Jonita Gandhi - Bollywood singer
Jinder Mahal - WWE wrestler

K
Cassius Khan - musician instrument
Ravi Kahlon - field hockey player
Darshan Kang - Alberta MP
Hari Kant - former field hockey goalkeeper
Rupi Kaur - poet
Jujhar Khaira - NHL player for the Edmonton Oilers
Vim Kochhar - businessman and senator
Koushik - hip hop musician
Kuldip Singh Kular - former Ontario Liberal MPP
Bindi Kullar - field hockey player
Faisal Kutty - attorney, writer and law professor
Kader Khan - actor, screenwriter
Akshay Kumar - Bollywood actor

L
Harold Sonny Ladoo - novelist and author
Vaughn Lal - bassist and backing vocalist for heavy metal band Brown Brigade
Harry Lali - BC NDP MLA
Nancy Lee - short story writer and novelist
Sunny Leone - Actress

M
Jinder Mahal (real name Yuvraj Singh Dhesi) – wrestler
Anita Majumdar - actress
Shaun Majumder - actor/comedian
Masumeh Makhija - actress
Gurbax Singh Malhi - former Liberal MP
Manny Malhotra - former NHL player
Samir Mallal - filmmaker
Amrit Mangat - Ontario Liberal MPP
Irshad Manji - author
Harbhajan Mann - singer
Salim Mansur - columnist for the London Free Press and the Toronto Sun
Bharat Masrani - Chief Executive Officer of the Toronto-Dominion Bank 
Suleka Mathew - actress
Ashok Mathur - writer and professor
Maxim Mazumdar - playwright and founder of the Stephenville Theatre Festival
Suhana Meharchand - journalist, Canadian Broadcasting Corporation
Deepa Mehta - film director (Bollywood/Hollywood, Fire, Earth, Water)
Nicky Mehta - singer
Richie Mehta - director
Shaun Mehta - writer
Rohinton Mistry - novelist
Shani Mootoo - writer
Alok Mukherjee - current chair of the Toronto Police Services Board
Audri Mukhopadhyay - Canadian Diplomat. Former Consul General in Ho Chi Minh City, Vietnam
M. Ram Murty - head of the Department of Mathematics and Statistics at Queen's University
Tad Murty
Nadir Mohamed - Former President & CEO of Rogers Communications

N
 Roger Nair - filmmaker, Human Rights activist, actor, executive on Toronto Film Board
 Naheed Nenshi - mayor of Calgary
 Rob Nijjar - former BC Liberal MLA
 Nav - rapper and producer from Toronto, Ontario signed to The Weeknd's XO record label

O
 Deepak Obhrai - former Alberta Conservative MP, Calgary
 Wally Oppal - former Attorney General of British Columbia

P
Parichav - Singer, Music Producer, Composer and Live Performer
Lata Pada - Bharatanatyam dancer
Raj Pannu - former leader of the Alberta New Democrats, the first Indian-Canadian leader of a political party
Jivesh Parasram, playwright
Ashish Patel - cricket player
Jitendra Patel - cricket player
Nilesh Patel - film director and producer
Jason Patraj - cricket player
Russell Peters - stand-up comedian
Ranj Pillai - Premier of Yukon
Abishur Prakash - geopolitical futurist, author
Priyanka - drag artist, and winner of Canada's Drag Race Season 1
Ishwar Puri - scientist, academic, Fellow of Canadian Academy of Engineering, NSERC Council member

Q

R
Rup Magon - International Singer and Actor Rup Magon
Raghav - R&B singer
Pamela Rai - Canadian Olympic swimmer, 1984 bronze medallist, first Punjabi woman to win an Olympic medal
Monita Rajpal - CNN International news anchor
Rudy Ramcharan - curler
Emile Ramsammy - thoroughbred horse racer
Meaghan Rath -  actress
Lisa Ray - film actress
Ajmer Rode - poet and playwright
Renee Rosnes - jazz pianist and composer/arranger
Rajat Bedi - Bollywood actor-turned film producer who settled in Canada

S
Vik Sahay - actor
Patty Sahota - former BC Liberal MLA
Deep Saini - Vice-President of University of Toronto
Shaiju Mathew - Author and Filmmaker
Sugar Sammy - comedian
Sathajhan Sarachandran - Convicted in 2009 of providing support to terrorist groups in Sri Lanka
Emanuel Sandhu - figure skater
Madeline Schizas - figure skater
Surendra Seeraj - cricket player
Asha Seth - senator
Chandrakant Shah - academic researcher, doctor, and social activist; recipient of Order of Ontario
Melinda Shankar - actress
Rosette Sharma - singer and dancer
Rekha Sharma - actress
Devinder Shory - Member of Parliament
Vivek Shraya - writer and musician
Haroon Siddiqui - reporter, editor and columnist
Moe Sihota - former British Columbia NDP MLA and television host and first Indo-Canadian elected to any legislature in Canada back in 1986
Hannah Simone - actress, TV host, and fashion model
Bobby Singh - played for the BC Lions in the CFL
Jaggi Singh - anti-globalisation and social justice activist
Jagmeet Singh - politician, leader of the NDP
Jasmeet Singh - YouTube personality known as Jus Reign
Jaspreet Singh - author
Lilly Singh - motivational speaker and YouTube personality
Tiger Jeet Singh - wrestler currently in Japan
Pamela Mala Sinha - actress, playwright
Errol Sitahal - actor
Amarjeet Sohi - politician, incumbent Mayor of Edmonton
Ajit H. Someshwar - businessman and philanthropist
Ashwin Sood - drummer for (and former husband of) Sarah McLachlan
Manoj Sood - actor (Little Mosque on the Prairie)
Durand Soraine - cricket player
Shweta Subram - Bollywood playback singer
Moez Surani - poet
Rajiv Surendra - actor

T
 Proma Tagore - writer and novelist
 Harinder Takhar - Ontario Liberal MPP and Minister of Transportation
 Harpal Talhan - lightweight boxer 
Nina Tangri - MPP, Ontario
 Sam Tata - portrait photographer, born in Shanghai and lived in Montreal
 Shashaa Tirupati - Bollywood singer
 Tommy Genesis - Indian-Canadian rapper and model

U
Priscila Uppal - novelist and poet
Tim Uppal - MP, Alberta

V
Sugith Varughese - actor
M.G. Vassanji - novelist
Aliza Vellani - actress (Little Mosque on the Prairie)
Ali Velshi - stock analyst and television journalist
Murad Velshi - former Ontario Liberal MPP
Neelam Verma - Miss Universe Canada 2002
Richard Verma - U.S. Ambassador to India since 2015
Vandana Vishwas - World Music Artist

W
Ravi Walia - figure skater
Supinder Wraich - actress

X

Y

Z
Ravi Zacharias - Christian apologist, speaker, author

See also
 Indian American
 British Indian
 Indo-Canadian
 Indian South Africans
 List of Indian Americans
 List of Indian Britons

References

Canadians
Indian
Canadians
Lists of Canadian people by ethnic or national origin